Laura Colleen Gloria Brock (born 28 November 1989) is an Australian soccer player who plays for EA Guingamp in the Division 1 Féminine. She made her debut for the national team in 2010.

Club career

Melbourne Victory, 2008–2010 
Alleway played as a defender for Melbourne Victory in the first two seasons of Australia's W-League. Melbourne Victory finished fifth in the eight-team league both seasons, failing to make the finals.

Brisbane Roar, 2010–2015 
In Alleway's first season with Brisbane Roar FC, the team finished the regular season in second behind Sydney FC, but went on to defeat them in the Grand Final winning the title of league Champions.

The team again finished second in the 2011–12 season, but lost their Champions title to Canberra United in the Grand Final.

In January 2012, at the end of the W-League season, Alleway and Collette McCallum joined English club Lincoln Ladies for the 2012 FA WSL season. Alleway's move to Lincoln was derailed by visa problems in March 2012.

Alleway returned to Brisbane Roar FC for a third season in which the team won the title of Premiers as the highest ranked team at the end of the regular season. They were defeated by Sydney FC in the semi-finals.

The 2013–14 season saw the Roar concede the Grand Final to Alleway's former club, Melbourne Victory while the team failed to make the finals the following season finishing in 6th place. During her time on the team, Alleway was a key player for Brisbane Roar's defence appearing in 52 of the team's 67 matches.

Melbourne City, 2015–2016 
In August 2015, Alleway signed with Melbourne City in the team's inaugural season. The team finished the season undefeated winning both the premiership and the championship. Alleway played 857 minutes in 11 matches including 9 starts. The defence conceded a total of only 5 goals in the regular season and the finals.

Orlando Pride, 2016–2017 
In March 2016, Alleway and Melbourne City teammate Steph Catley joined the NWSL's newest expansion club the Orlando Pride. Orlando Pride coach Tom Sermanni gave Alleway her first cap for Australia when he was coach of the Matildas in 2010. Alleway started all five of the team's first matches before a groin-injury put her on the sidelines for the sixth week of the season.

In 2017, she played only 136 minutes for the Pride before the team waived her midway through the season.

Melbourne Victory, 2017– 
On 29 August 2017, Alleway returned to Melbourne Victory signing a two-year deal.

International career

Senior national team debut, 2010 
Alleway earned her first cap for the Matildas on 6 March 2010, coming in as a substitute against DPR Korea in a friendly in preparation for the AFC Asia Women's Championship. Australia won the match 3–2 with a last-minute goal from Kyah Simon.

2011 FIFA Women's World Cup 
Alleway was named to the Australian squad for the 2011 Women's World Cup in Germany. She played in only one game, coming on as a substitute in the 81st minute in a 2–1 victory over Norway in the final match of the group stage. This win allowed the Matildas to progress to the quarter-finals where they were defeated by Sweden.

2015 FIFA Women's World Cup 
Alleway started all five of Australia's games at the 2015 Women's World Cup in Canada for a total of 443 minutes of play. Australia was eliminated in the quarter-finals by Japan.

2016 Olympic qualifiers 
The Matildas came out of the qualifiers for the 2016 Olympic Games in Rio undefeated and saw their FIFA ranking jump from 9th to 5th. Alleway started in 4 of the 5 games, sitting out only Australia's 9–0 rout of Vietnam racking up 381 minutes of play.

2019 FIFA Women's World Cup
Alleway was selected in the Australian team for the 2019 FIFA Women's World Cup in France, however she was replaced shortly before the tournament after sustaining a foot injury. She chose to stay in France to follow the team at her own expense.

2020 Olympics and retirement
In June 2021, Brock was selected as a travelling reserve for the postponed 2020 Summer Olympics. The following week, FIFA confirmed that for the 2020 Olympics, due to the challenges of the COVID-19 pandemic, all 22 players selected would be available on the roster, shifting Brock into the squad.

At the Olympics, the Matildas advanced to the quarter-finals with one victory and a draw in the group play. In the quarter-finals they beat Great Britain 4-3 after extra time. However, they lost 1–0 to Sweden in the semi-final and were then beaten 4–3 in the bronze medal playoff by USA. Full details.

Brock announced her retirement at the end of the tournament, coming on in the 87th minute of the bronze medal match as her last game for the Matildas.

Career statistics

Club 

1FA Women's League Cup and Women's French Cup.

International goals 
Scores and results list Australia's goal tally first.

Honours

Individual 
 PFA Women's Footballer of the Year Nominee: 2015

Club 
Brisbane Roar
 W-League Championship: 2010–11
 W-League Premiership: 2012–13

Melbourne City
 W-League Championship: 2015–16
 W-League Premiership: 2015–16

International
 AFC Olympic Qualifying Tournament: 2016
 Tournament of Nations: 2017
 FFA Cup of Nations: 2019

See also 

 Women's soccer in Australia
 Foreign players in the FA WSL

References

External links 

 Matildas player profile
 Orlando Pride player profile 
 Melbourne City player profile 

1989 births
Living people
Australian Institute of Sport soccer players
Australian women's soccer players
Melbourne Victory FC (A-League Women) players
Brisbane Roar FC (A-League Women) players
Notts County L.F.C. players
Melbourne City FC (A-League Women) players
Women's Super League players
A-League Women players
Australia women's international soccer players
2011 FIFA Women's World Cup players
2015 FIFA Women's World Cup players
Footballers at the 2016 Summer Olympics
Soccer players from Melbourne
Women's association football defenders
Orlando Pride players
National Women's Soccer League players
Expatriate women's soccer players in the United States
Australian expatriate sportspeople in the United States
Australian expatriate soccer players
Australian expatriate sportspeople in England
Expatriate women's footballers in England
Olympic soccer players of Australia
Footballers at the 2020 Summer Olympics
En Avant Guingamp (women) players
Australian expatriate sportspeople in France
Expatriate women's footballers in France
People from Templestowe, Victoria